The following is a list of English Renaissance theatres, from the first theatres built in 1567, to their closure at the beginning of the English Civil War in 1642.

English Renaissance theatres were more commonly known by the term 'playhouses'. They can be divided into indoor playhouses (which were small and performed to high-paying audiences) and outdoor playhouses (large, partly open-air amphitheatres that charged lower prices).

Outdoor playhouses 

 The Boar's Head, Whitechapel
 The Curtain, Shoreditch
 The Fortune
 The Globe, Bankside
 The Hope, Bankside
 Newington Butts
 The Red Bull, Clerkenwell
 The Red Lion, Mile End
 The Rose, Bankside
 The Swan, Bankside
 The Theatre, Shoreditch

Indoor playhouses 
 Blackfriars Theatre (two sites, near to one another)
 The Cockpit-in-Court, part of the Palace of Whitehall
 Cockpit Theatre, later renamed to The Phoenix, Drury Lane
 Porter's Hall Theatre, or Puddle Wharf, Blackfriars
 Salisbury Court Theatre, off Fleet Street
 St. Paul's Theatre, St. Paul's Cathedral
 Whitefriars Theatre, off Fleet Street

See also
English Renaissance theatre
Inn-yard theatre
List of former theatres in London
List of London venues
Theatre of the United Kingdom

 
English renaissance theatres
English Renaissance